Kerabari is a village development committee in Morang District in the Kosi Zone of south-eastern Nepal. At the time of the 1991 Nepal census it had a population of 12,031 people living in 2129 individual households.

References

Kerabari Rural Municipality